Weld County is a county located in the U.S. state of Colorado. As of the 2020 census, the population was 328,981. The county seat is Greeley.

Weld County comprises the Greeley, CO Metropolitan Statistical Area, which is included in the Denver–Aurora, CO Combined Statistical Area.

History

On May 30, 1854, the Kansas–Nebraska Act created the Nebraska Territory and the Kansas Territory, divided by the Parallel 40° North (Baseline Road or County Line Road or Weld County Road 2 in the future Weld County). Present-day Weld County, Colorado, lay in the southwestern portion of the Nebraska Territory, bordering the Kansas Territory.

In July 1858, gold was discovered along the South Platte River in Arapahoe County, Kansas Territory.  This discovery precipitated the Pike's Peak Gold Rush.  Many residents of the mining region felt disconnected from the remote territorial governments of Kansas and Nebraska, so they voted to form their own Territory of Jefferson on October 24, 1859.  The following month, the Jefferson Territorial Legislature organized 12 counties for the new territory, including St. Vrain County.  St. Vrain County was named in honor of Ceran de Hault de Lassus de St. Vrain, the French trader who established the first trading post on the upper South Platte River.  St. Vrain County encompassed much of what is today Weld County.

The Jefferson Territory never received federal sanction, but on February 28, 1861, U.S. President James Buchanan signed an act organizing the Territory of Colorado.  On November 1, 1861, the Colorado General Assembly organized 17 counties, including Weld County, for the new Colorado Territory.  Weld County was named for Lewis Ledyard Weld, a lawyer and territorial secretary.  He died while serving in the Union Army during the Civil War.  Until February 9, 1887, Weld County's boundaries included the area now comprising Weld County, Washington County, Logan County, Morgan County, Yuma County, Phillips County, and Sedgwick County.

Weld County was thrust into the media spotlight on the evening of November 1, 1955, when United Airlines Flight 629, a Douglas DC-6B airliner flying from Denver to Portland, Oregon, exploded in midair and crashed, killing all 44 persons on board the plane and scattering bodies, wreckage and debris over a six-square-mile area of the county.  The subsequent investigation of the accident revealed that Denver resident John Gilbert Graham had secretly placed a time bomb composed of 25 sticks of dynamite in a suitcase belonging to his mother, who was a passenger on the airplane.  Graham was tried and convicted of the crime, and executed in 1957.

In northeastern Weld County, Minuteman III missile silo "N-8", one of the many unmanned silos there, was the target of symbolic vandalism by Catholic peace activists in 2002.

Weld County also holds the distinction of having more confirmed tornado sightings than any other U.S. county from 1950 to 2011, with 252 confirmed reports.

On March 6, 2019, the county declared itself to be a Second Amendment sanctuary.

Secession proposals
In 2013, conservative Weld County commissioners began a campaign to secede from the State of Colorado to create a new state; a state ballot measure regarding the issue was put on the November 2013 ballot. The legality of this initiative has been questioned by local attorneys. On Nov 5th, 2013, 6 out of 11 Colorado counties voted no for secession, including Weld County.  Elbert, Lincoln, Logan, Moffat, Sedgwick, and Weld counties voted no, while Cheyenne, Kit Carson, Phillips, Washington, and Yuma counties voted yes.  "Weld County voters said this is an option we shouldn't pursue and we won't pursue it," said Weld County Commissioner Sean Conway, "But we will continue to look at the problems of the urban and rural divide in this state."

In 2021, a group known as "Weld County, WY" organized a petition to place a measure on the November 2021 ballot for the county to secede from Colorado to join Wyoming, due to a clash between the conservative politics of Weld County and the liberal government of Colorado. Mark Gordon, the Governor of Wyoming, said when asked about the topic, "We would love that." In response to Gordon's comment, Colorado Governor Jared Polis said, "Hands off Weld County."

Geography

It is the third-largest county in Colorado by area.

Along the western border, hilly areas indicate the presence of the foothills of the Rocky Mountains further west.

The county is served by two interstate highways: I-25 (US 87) runs through the southwestern corner and I-76 from the south central edge northeastward to the Morgan county border. Other major roads include US 85 and US 34, which intersect near Greeley, and State Highway 14, which runs through Ault.

Adjacent counties

 Kimball County, Nebraska - northeast
 Logan County - east
 Morgan County - east
 Adams County - south
 City and County of Broomfield - southwest
 Boulder County - west
 Larimer County - west
 Laramie County, Wyoming - northwest

Major Highways
  Interstate 25
  Interstate 76
 
  U.S. Highway 6
  U.S. Highway 34
  U.S. Highway 85
  U.S. Highway 87
  State Highway 7
  State Highway 14
  State Highway 37
  State Highway 52
  State Highway 56
  State Highway 60
  State Highway 66
  State Highway 71
  State Highway 79
  State Highway 257
  State Highway 263
  State Highway 392

National protected area

 Pawnee National Grassland

State protected area
 Fort Vasquez State History Museum
 St. Vrain State Park

Trails and byways
 American Discovery Trail
 Pawnee Pioneer Trails
 Poudre River National Recreation Trail
 South Platte Trail

Demographics

As of the census of 2000, there were 180,936 people, 63,247 households, and 45,221 families residing in the county. The population density was 45 people per square mile (18/km2). There were 66,194 housing units at an average density of 17 per square mile (6/km2). The racial makeup of the county was 81.71% White, 0.56% Black or African American, 0.87% Native American, 0.83% Asian, 0.08% Pacific Islander, 13.29% from other races, and 2.65% from two or more races. 27.05% of the population were Hispanic or Latino of any race.

There were 63,247 households, out of which 37.20% had children under the age of 18 living with them, 57.60% were married couples living together, 9.40% had a female householder with no husband present, and 28.50% were non-families. 21.00% of all households were made up of individuals, and 6.90% had someone living alone who was 65 years of age or older. The average household size was 2.78 and the average family size was 3.25.

In the county, the population was spread out, with 28.20% under the age of 18, 13.20% from 18 to 24, 29.70% from 25 to 44, 20.00% from 45 to 64, and 9.00% who were 65 years of age or older. The median age was 31 years. For every 100 females there were 100.60 males. For every 100 females age 18 and over, there were 98.00 males.

The median income for a household in the county was $42,321, and the median income for a family was $49,569. Males had a median income of $35,037 versus $25,757 for females. The per capita income for the county was $18,957. About 8.00% of families and 12.50% of the population were below the poverty line, including 14.60% of those under age 18 and 8.50% of those age 65 or over.

Economy
Weld County is Colorado's leading producer of cattle, grain and sugar beets, and is the richest agricultural county in the United States east of the Rocky Mountains, and the fourth richest overall nationally. It is also becoming more important as a milk producing county, with close to half of the state's cattle.  Weld County is also an important area of oil and natural gas production in the Denver-Julesburg Basin.

Communities

Cities

 Brighton‡
 Dacono
 Evans
 Fort Lupton
 Greeley
 Longmont‡
 Northglenn‡
 Thornton (part)‡

Towns

 Ault
 Berthoud ‡
 Eaton
 Erie‡
 Firestone
 Frederick
 Garden City
 Gilcrest
 Grover
 Hudson
 Johnstown‡
 Keenesburg
 Kersey
 LaSalle
 Lochbuie‡
 Mead
 Milliken
 Nunn
 Pierce
 Platteville
 Raymer
 Severance
 Windsor‡

Census-designated places

 Aristocrat Ranchettes 
 Briggsdale

Unincorporated communities

 Auburn
 Avalo
 Carr
 Dearfield
 Galeton (originally called "Zita")
 Gill
 Hereford
 Highlandlake
 Ione
 Keota
 Lucerne
 Roggen
 Stoneham
 Wattenburg

Ghost towns

 Alden
 Dearfield
 Elwell
 Fort St. Vrain
 Latham
 Masters
 Rosedale
 Serene
 Sligo

‡ means a populated place has portions in an adjacent county or counties

Politics
Similar to the fellow Denver Metropolitan Area county of Douglas, Weld leans Republican. Except for Lyndon Johnson’s 1964 landslide win over Barry Goldwater, it has not voted for a Democratic presidential candidate since 1936.

Education
School districts serving Weld County include:
 Ault-Highland School District RE-9
 Briggsdale School District RE-10
 Eaton School District RE-2
 Greeley School District 6
 Johnstown-Milliken School District RE-5J
 Pawnee School District RE-12
 Platte Valley School District RE-7
 Prairie School District RE-11
 School District 27J
 St. Vrain Valley School District RE 1J
 Thompson School District R-2J
 Weld County School District RE-1
 Weld County School District RE-3J
 Weld County School District RE-8
 Weldon Valley School District RE-20J
 Wiggins School District RE-50J
 Windsor School District RE-4

See also

 Outline of Colorado
 Index of Colorado-related articles
 St. Vrains County, Jefferson Territory
 Colorado census statistical areas
 Fort St. Vrain Generating Station
 Front Range Urban Corridor
 National Register of Historic Places listings in Weld County, Colorado
 Impact of the 2019–20 coronavirus pandemic on the meat industry in the United States

References

External links

 
 Colorado County Evolution by Don Stanwyck
 Colorado Historical Society
 Greeley/Weld Economic Development Action Partnership, Inc. (EDAP)

 
Colorado counties
1861 establishments in Colorado Territory
Eastern Plains
Populated places established in 1861